The Canonsburg Armory is a former Pennsylvania National Guard armory in Canonsburg, Pennsylvania. It was listed on the National Register of Historic Places on December 22, 1989.

It is designated as a historic public landmark by the Washington County History & Landmarks Foundation.

History 
The armory was built in 1938 at a cost of $85,548, funded by the Public Works Administration.

In 2010, the armory was sold to the Borough of Canonsburg for $268,000.

See also 
 National Register of Historic Places listings in Washington County, Pennsylvania

Notes

References 

 

Armories on the National Register of Historic Places in Pennsylvania
Pennsylvania National Guard
Colonial Revival architecture in Pennsylvania
Canonsburg, Pennsylvania
Infrastructure completed in 1938
Buildings and structures in Washington County, Pennsylvania
National Register of Historic Places in Washington County, Pennsylvania